Luis Alberto Caicedo Mosquera (born 18 May 1996) is a Colombian football midfielder currently playing for Houston Dynamo in Major League Soccer.

Club career
Caicedo joined Categoría Primera A side Cortuluá ahead of their 2015 season after spending one season with Sporting CP, where he made a single appearance for Sporting CP B and 20 appearances for their youth side. In March 2018, Caicedo was loaned to New England Revolution of Major League Soccer.

Caicedo's move to New England was made permanent at the end of their 2018 season.

On June 8, 2020, New England announced that Caicedo had undergone surgery on his right knee three months earlier and would miss the 2020 season and MLS is Back Tournament.

Career statistics

Club

References

1996 births
Living people
Association football midfielders
Colombian footballers
Sporting CP B players
Cortuluá footballers
Houston Dynamo FC players
New England Revolution players
New England Revolution II players
Colombian expatriate footballers
Colombian expatriate sportspeople in the United States
Expatriate footballers in Portugal
Expatriate soccer players in the United States
Major League Soccer players
People from Apartadó
USL League One players
Sportspeople from Antioquia Department
21st-century Colombian people